John W. Lewis Jr. (September 6, 1905 – August 12, 1977) was an American politician.

Born in Marshall, Illinois, Lewis graduated from Marshall Township High School and then went to University of Illinois. He was a farmer auctioneer, and livestock dealer. He served in the Illinois House of Representatives from 1940 until 1958 and was a Republican. In 1958, he was then elected to the Illinois State Senate. However, in 1962 Lewis was again elected to the Illinois House of Representatives and served until 1968 and served as speaker. Lewis was appointed director of the Illinois Department of Agriculture in 1969. In 1970, he was appointed Illinois Secretary of State and served until 1973.

He unsuccessfully sought the Republican nomination for United States Senator in 1960.

Notes

1905 births
1977 deaths
People from Marshall, Illinois
University of Illinois alumni
Farmers from Illinois
Republican Party members of the Illinois House of Representatives
Secretaries of State of Illinois
Republican Party Illinois state senators
Speakers of the Illinois House of Representatives
20th-century American businesspeople
20th-century American politicians